Magong (POJ: Má-keng) is a county-administered city and seat of Penghu County, Taiwan. Magong City is located on Penghu's main island.

Name 
The settlement's temple honoring the Chinese Goddess Mazu, the deified form of Lin Moniang from medieval Fujian Province, is usually accounted the oldest in all of Taiwan and Penghu. The town was originally named Makeng but was changed to  during Japanese rule in 1920, and was the center of the Mako Guard District.

After 1945, the Wade-Giles romanization Makung was used. Taiwan officially adopted Tongyong Pinyin in 2002 and Hanyu Pinyin in 2009, leading to the romanization Magong.

History

The island's Mazu temple was erected in the late 16th or early 17th century. The city Magong'ao began to grow around 1887, during the rule of the Qing dynasty.

Under Japanese rule, the settlement was renamed Makō and organized as a subprefecture of Hōko. The area was a major base of the Imperial Japanese Navy. It was an embarkation point for the invasion of the Philippines during the Second World War.

Republic of China
On 25 December 1981, Makung was upgraded from an urban township to a county-administered city.

Administration 

Magong City contains 33 municipal villages:
 (Romanizations are in Hanyu Pinyin)
 Fuxing 
 Chang'an 
 Zhongyang 
 Qiming 
 Chongqing 
 Zhongxing 
 Guangfu 
 Guangming 
 Guangrong 
 Chaoyang 
 Yangming 
 Chongguang 
 Xiwei 
 Xiwen 
 Dongwen 
 Anshan 
 Guanghua 
 Qianliao 
 Shiquan 
 Caiyuan 
 Dongwei 
 Anzhe 
 Xingren 
 Wukan 
 Tiexian 
 Suogang 
 Shanshui 
 Wude 
 Jing'an 
 Shili 
 Fenggui 
 Hujing centred on Hujing Islet (Hóo-tsínn-sū) 
 Tongpan centred on Tongpan Island (Tháng-puânn-sū)

Government institutions
 Penghu County Council

Education
 National Penghu University of Science and Technology

Energy

The city is powered by the Hujing Power Plant located on Table Island.

Climate 
Magong has a very warm humid subtropical climate under the Köppen system. Due to the maritime influence, diurnal temperature variation is very low, but in spite of being right on the boundary with the tropics and having  winter lows it falls short of being such a climate. This is courtesy of the influence of the cool Asian landmass and prevailing winds in winter. As a result, the coldest month just falls short of the  isotherm. In summer, Magong receives monsoonal rainfall with moderated but hot temperatures. While afternoons most often stay in the low 30's Celsius, nights remain above  for several months. It is drier than many mainland areas of Taiwan, although it still frequently is cloudy.

Tourist attractions 

 Central Street
 Chang Yu-sheng Memorial Museum
 Erdai Art Hall
 Fenggui Cave
 Fengguiwei Fort
 First Guesthouse
 Four-eyed Well
 Jinguitou Fortress
 Magong Beiji Temple
 Magong Old City Wall
 Mazu Temple
 Ocean Resources Museum
 Penghu Living Museum
 Penghu Reclamation Hall
 Shigong Temple
 Suogang Fishing Port

Transportation 
Penghu Airport operates domestic flights and Magong Harbor hosts ferry connections to Kaohsiung, Tainan, Chiayi and Kinmen.

Notable natives
 Chang Yu-sheng, former singer, composer and producer
 Pan An-bang, former singer, TV presenter and actor
 Tsai Chih-chan, poet and educator

References

External links 

 

County-administered cities of Taiwan
Populated places in Penghu County